Yu Beichen is a former major general in the Republic of China Army and currently a Taiwanese non-partisan politician. His personnel background in the military was from the fraction of General Kao Hua-chu and General Lee Hsiang-chou. He was involved in Taiwanese politics after his retirement and currently runs his own YouTube channel, and was owned the nickname of the “Donated-General”.

Personal life
Yu Beichen  was born on January 2, 1968, in Taipei. His ancestry goes back to China's Shandong province.

Military career

He joined the military in 1990. He moved up the ranks and was a major general at the time of his retirement in 2015. In 2015, citing concerns relating to his health and work-related stress, he retired from the military.

Political career
Yu Beichen was a member of the Kuomintang party in Taiwan from 1985 to 2021. After his retirement from the military, he served as chairman of Huangfuxing's Taoyuan Kuomintang party headquarters, as well as the vice-chairman of the KMT's Taoyuan city party headquarters. He was dismissed from these roles in 2020. Later, at the end of 2021, he publicly announced that he was quitting the Kuomintang party over disagreements regarding the party's direction, including disagreement about a lack of strength in standing up to the mainland.

Commentator
He currently has his own YouTube channel with over 100,000 subscribers as of May 2022. He has appeared in political talk shows in Taiwan. In May 2022, he criticized the Chen Mingtong the head of the RoC's intelligence for publicly revealing specific intelligence regarding Chinese plans for invading Taiwan and the makeup of Xi Jinping's cabinet following the 20th CCP party congress

References

Living people
1968 births